Agnes-Françoise Le Louchier (1660-1717), was the royal mistress of Maximilian II Emanuel, Elector of Bavaria from 1694 until 1717. She also served as the spy of Bavaria at the French court.

Biography
Agnès-Françoise Lelouchier was the daughter of Jean François Le Louchier, Seigneur de Popuelles and his wife Charlotte d' Aubermont. A member of the Flemish nobility, she became the lover of Maximilian II Emanuel when he was the governor of the Spanish Netherlands. She accompanied him to Bavaria in 1694, when he married his second spouse, Theresa Kunegunda Sobieska, while she herself married the Bavarian officer count Ferdinand von Arco. After the wedding, they returned to Brussels. She had a son with Maximilian, named Emanuel-François-Joseph (1695-1747), who was later legitimized by his father. In 1700, the electress wished to separate from the elector because of this affair but managed to reconcile. The same year, the elector and electress returned to Bavaria. Le Louchier was given an assignment as a spy by the elector and sent to Paris to make use of political connections in favour of Bavarian interests. She succeeded with her task and was rewarded with a life pension. She lived with Maximilian during his exile from 1704 to 1715 until he met his wife again on 8 April 1715.

Notes

Sources 
Ludwig Hüttl: Max Emanuel – der Blaue Kurfürst, 1679–1726. Eine politische Biographie. Süddeutscher Verlag, München 1976, .
Karl Eduard Vehse: Bayerische Hofgeschichten. Bearbeitet, eingeleitet und mit Anmerkungen herausgegeben von Joachim Delbrück. München 1922.
Werner Sombart: Liebe, Luxus und Kapitalismus. Über die Entstehung der modernen Welt aus dem Geist der Verschwendung, Heidelberg 1913
Peter Claus Hartmann: Der Chevalier De Baviére. ZBLB, Band 31, 1968 S. 286 - 297.
Richard Paulus: Max Emanuel und die französische Kunst, Altbayerische Monatsschrift, Jg. 11, München 1913

Mistresses of German royalty
1660 births
1717 deaths
18th-century spies